Silver Spring is an unincorporated community located in West Hempfield Township in Lancaster County, Pennsylvania.  The community is located along Pennsylvania Route 23.

About the Village 
Silver Spring has one Coptic church (Saint Mary Church). The Coptic church is one of only about six Coptic Orthodox parishes in Pennsylvania, and one of only 200 Coptic Churches in the United States.

Silver Spring's ZIP code is 17575, although, the Village is split into two zip codes (Lancaster – 17601 and Columbia – 17512) for those who do not use a post office box. Many people who live in Silver Spring actually have Rural Route Numbers as their primary postal identification.

Recreation 
Silver Spring has three lakes and two parks that offer recreational opportunities. Purple Lake is a small lake at the end of Purple Lake Drive. Mud Lake is a small lake located near Sycamore Dive. Grubb Lake is a  lake (part of the old Chestnut Hill Iron Ore Mine) that is part of the  Lake Grubb Nature Park which includes a mile-long hiking trail (of which, one-quarter mile is ADA accessible), fishing, playground, and picnic areas. The  Silver Spring Park offers soccer fields, baseball and volleyball fields, playground area, and picnic areas.

References

External links 
 West Hempfield Township
 West Hempfield Fire and Rescue

Unincorporated communities in Lancaster County, Pennsylvania
Unincorporated communities in Pennsylvania